The Best of Connie Smith may refer to:

The Best of Connie Smith (1967 album)
The Best of Connie Smith (1989 album)

See also
Connie Smith albums discography